Laili or Leili may refer to:
 Laili (cave), a cave in East Timor
 Laili (horse), a warhorse belonging to Maharaja Ranjit Singh of the Sikh Empire
 MS Leili or MS Hildasay

People with the name
 Laili Helms, Taliban advocate
 Leili Rashidi, Iranian theater and film actress

See also
 Leila (disambiguation)
 Leyli Khaneh or Laili Kand, a village in Bakrabad Rural District, Iran